Włodzimierz Andrzej Stefański (born 20 November 1949) is a Polish former volleyball player, a member of the Poland national team from 1969 to 1980. During his career, he won the titles of the 1976 Olympic Champion and the 1974 World Champion.

Personal life
He was born in Wrocław, Poland. He lives in Finland.

Honours

Clubs
 National championships
 1973/1974  Polish Championship, with Resovia
 1974/1975  Polish Cup, with Resovia
 1974/1975  Polish Championship, with Resovia

External links
 
 
 Player profile at Volleybox.net

1949 births
Living people
Sportspeople from Wrocław
Polish men's volleyball players
Olympic volleyball players of Poland
Volleyball players at the 1972 Summer Olympics
Volleyball players at the 1976 Summer Olympics
Olympic medalists in volleyball
Olympic gold medalists for Poland
Medalists at the 1976 Summer Olympics
Gwardia Wrocław players
Resovia (volleyball) players
Legia Warsaw (volleyball) players